Stéphane Le Diraison is a French sailor born on 5 June 1976 in Hennebont. He is an offshore sailor and is competing in the 2020–2021 Vendée Globe onboard IMOCA 60 called Time For Oceans.

References

External links
 

1976 births
Living people
Sportspeople from Morbihan
People from Hennebont
French male sailors (sport)
IMOCA 60 class sailors
French Vendee Globe sailors
2016 Vendee Globe sailors
2020 Vendee Globe sailors
Vendée Globe finishers